Štěpán Kopecký (1901–1956) was a Czech art director. He designed the sets for more than eighty films during his career.

Selected filmography
 The Inspector General (1933)
 Annette in Paradise (1934)
 Polish Blood (1934)
 Volga in Flames (1934)
 Grand Hotel Nevada (1935)
 Delightful Story (1936)
 Three Men in the Snow (1936)
 Cause for Divorce (1937)
 Sign of the Anchor  (1947)
 Border Street (1948)

References

Bibliography
 Bergfelder, Tim & Harris, Sue & Street, Sarah. Film Architecture and the Transnational Imagination: Set Design in 1930s European Cinema. Amsterdam University Press, 2007.

External links

1901 births
1956 deaths
Czech art directors
Mass media people from Prague